Baria massacre was the massacre of unarmed Bengali Hindus in the village of Baria in present-day Gazipur Sadar Upazila of Bangladesh by the Pakistan army on 14 May 1971. Around 200 Bengali Hindus from Baria and nearby Kamaria were killed in the massacre, while hundreds more were injured.

Background 
The village of Baria fell under Joydebpur sub-division of Dhaka district. At present it falls under Gazipur District of Dhaka Division. It is located at a distance of 8 km from the palace of Bhawal estate in Gazipur. In 1971, Baria was an almost exclusively Hindu inhabited village. The Pakistan army launched Operation Searchlight on 25 May. They set up a cantonment at the Bhawal estate.

Killings 
On 14 May at around 1pm, local collaborators Awal, Hakim Uddin and Majid Mian led a contingent of around 500 Pakistani soldiers from the army cantonment at Bhawal estate to Baria. After entering the village, the troops spread out in all directions and opened fire on the villagers. Many died on the spot while others were seriously injured. The perpetrators looted the houses and set most of them on fire. Some of the villagers attempted to flee by crossing the Belai beel. The troops opened fire on them as well. The belongings of the fleeing villagers were looted by the Pakistan army and the collaborators. The army shelled a water pump at the Belai beel mistaking it as a cannon.

The mayhem continued till 6pm. At around 7:30pm there was a heavy downpour. The indiscriminate shooting left around 200 villagers of Baria and Kamaria dead, including women and children. Hundreds of people were wounded in the gun fire.

Aftermath 
As the news of army killings in Baria spread to nearby villages, the Hindus left the villages and fled to relatively safer places.

References 

1971 Bangladesh genocide
Massacres of Bengali Hindus in East Pakistan
1971 in Bangladesh
Massacres in 1971
Massacres committed by Pakistan in East Pakistan
May 1971 events in Asia